Bistrica is a village near Slatina, Croatia. It is connected by the D2 highway.

References

Populated places in Virovitica-Podravina County